The Macau national korfball team represents Macau in international korfball.

Current squad
National team for the 2019 World Championship:

 Coach: Atte van Haastrecht
 Manager: Au Chi Cheng

References

National korfball teams
Korfball